Anat Zuria (born 1961) is an Israeli independent film director, creator of the films "Purity", "Sentenced to Marriage", "Black Bus," "The Lesson," "Conventional Sins," and "Reinvestigation."

Filmography

Between the years 2002-2010 Zuria created a documentary trilogy, dealing with women's stories within the Jewish Religious world. The three films all dealt with sexuality, independence and other social taboos which were never before documented in Israeli cinema.

The first film in the trilogy, "Purity", told the story of three religious women whose life and identity were challenged by the laws of purity (Niddah). The film exposes for the first time a feminist critical viewpoint on sexuality in Orthodox Jewish.

"Sentenced to Marriage", the second film in the trilogy, is a documentary courtroom drama which takes place in the rabbinical courts in Israel. The film follows the story of three young women who struggled to get a get, a divorce, from their husbands. For two years the film documented the legal drama of divorce in light of the Jewish religious laws.

"Black Bus", the third film, documented the phenomenon of gender segregation in Jewish religious society. The film goes through the story of two young ultra-Orthodox that paid a personal price on their attempt to work against the laws of segregation.

Her current film, "the Lesson", follows the extraordinary story of an Egyptian women fighting for her independence. "The Lesson" was shown in Haifa Film Festival 2012.

Purity

Director and Script: Anat Yota Zuria
Producer: Amit Bruier
Editor: Era Lapid
Cinematography: Nurit Aviv, Tulik Galon, Shiri Bar-on 
Original score: Jonathan Bar Giora

This documentary film broke taboos and examined how the laws of Taharat Hamishpaha (family purity) shape women’s lives and sexuality within Orthodox Judaism. It won prizes such as:
 Jerusalem International Film Festival, Jerusalem, July 2002: Mayor Award for Best Documentary Film
 YAMAGATA International Documentary Film Festival, Japan, October 2003: Special Prize & Citizens’ Prize
 SCAM (Société Civile des Auteurs Multimedia) Prize for "Discovery of the Year", France, 2004

Sentenced to Marriage

Director and Script: Anat Yota Zuria
Producer: Amit Bruier
Executive Producer: Sigal Landesberg
Editor: Era Lapid
Cinematography: Roni Cazanelson
Original score: Jonathan Bar Giora

This documentary which was released on 2004 criticized for the first time the Rabbinical courts in Israel. The film is a legal drama which follows three women whose husbands refuse to grant a divorce to their wives, refuse to pay child support, and attend court only haphazardly due to the rabbinical court's understanding of the Jewish laws. The documentary shows a court system weighted heavily against women's favour , . The film caused much discussion in the Israeli media and was shown in the Israeli parliament, as well as held a special screening in the New-york MOMA. It won the following prizes:
 Hot Docs, Canada, 2005: Best Documentary award
 Jerusalem Film Festival, Israel, 2004: Wolgin Award for Best Documentary

Black Bus
Director and Script: Anat Yota Zuria
Producer: Sigal Landesberg and Anat Zuria 
Editor: Ara Lapid
Cinematography: Roni Cazanelson

The documentary shows the religious segregation within the ultra-Orthodox members of Israel's society. The film showed the stories of two young women from a Hasidim background which tried to battle for their independence. The film won the First prize in Haifa film Festival and was shown in the Berlin Film Festival as well as other festivals.

The Lesson
Director and Script: Anat Yota Zuria
Producer: Sigal Landesberg and Anat Zuria 
Editor: Ara Lapid
Cinematography: Roni Cazanelson

A film between a documentary and fiction, following the story of Layla Ibrahim, a Muslim woman learning to drive in the streets of Jerusalem. The film won the "Best documentary" award at Haifa International film festival, 2012.

Conventional Sins
Conventional sins is a film exposing sexual abuse of children in the ultra-Orthodox community: A decade after he was banished from the Hasidic community he grew up in, Meilech reopens the diary he wrote when he was 15. The diary describes the abuse he went through at the hands of a network of ultra-Orthodox pedophiles. Together with a group of young actors who themselves grew up in the Hasidic community, Meilech attempts to reconstruct parts of the diary and tell his story, which the Hasidic community did everything to silence. Winner of Best Documentary in The Jerusalem Film Festival.

Footnotes, References

External links
 Office website
 Anat Zuria, Film Review,Eretz Acheret Magazine
 Rivkah Luvitch, "It Is Necessary to Establish a System of Alternative Courts, Loyal to the Halakhah and Faithful to Changes in the Reality",Eretz Acheret Magazine
 "The Lesson" Facebook page, in Hebrew: https://www.facebook.com/hashiur

Israeli documentary film directors
Israeli feminists
Living people
1961 births
Israeli women film directors
Women documentary filmmakers